Černošice is a town in Prague-West District in the Central Bohemian Region of the Czech Republic. It has about 7,300 inhabitants.

Geography
The town is part of the Prague metropolitan area. It is located on the left bank of the Berounka River. It lies in the Hořovice Uplands, the northwestern part of the municipal territory extends into the Prague Plateau.

History

The present-day town is made up of three historical parts: Horní Černosice, Dolní Mokropsy and Vráž. The village of Dolní Mokropsy was first mentioned in 1088 and Horní Černošice in 1115. In Horní Černošice there was built the Church of the Assumption of the Virgin Mary which was first mentioned in 1352 when it served as a parish church. A few farms stood around this church. The villages stood at two important trade routes – the route from Prague to Bechyně and from Prague to Karlštejn Castle. With a break between 1422 and 1455, Černošice was owned by the Zbraslav Monastery from 1292 until the abolition of the monastery in 1785.

Černošice was heavily damaged during the Thirty Years' War in 1639 when it was burnt to the ground by the Swedish army moving towards Prague. During the war, there was a great decline in population because of the war losses, epidemics and emigration.
 
In 1862 the railway stations in Černošice were opened as a part of the new-built railway from Prague to Plzeň. The new railway brought about a tourist and building boom. Lidos were founded along the river and many new villas were built. Černošice became one of the most famous residential and weekend-cottage satellites before. During this time Černošice started to lose its agricultural character. The development of the town was stopped during the World Wars. In 1950, the originally separate municipalities were joined and named Černošice.

Demographics

Transport
In Černošice there are two train stations: Černošice and Černošice-Mokropsy.

Sights
The Catholic Church of the Assumption of the Virgin Mary was first mentioned in the 14th century and is the oldest preserved building in the town. It was baroque rebuilt at the beginning of the 18th century. It has a baroque altar from 1713.

In popular culture
The English book The Twelve Little Cakes by Dominka Dery was written about the life of a dissident family during the Communist times in Černošice.

Notable people
Jan Janský (1873–1921), serologist and neurologist; lived and died here
Břetislav Bartoš (1893–1926), painter; died here
Jaroslav Bouček (1912–1987), footballer
Vladimír Kobranov (1927–2015), ice hockey player
Dominika Dery (born 1975), journalist and writer

Twin towns – sister cities

Černošice is twinned with:
 Gerbrunn, Germany
 Leśnica, Poland
 Themar, Germany

References

External links

 
Civil society in Černošice 

Cities and towns in the Czech Republic